Douglas Leonard Newman (25 June 1920 – 10 September 1959) was an English first-class cricketer active 1948–53 who played for Middlesex and Marylebone Cricket Club (MCC). He was born in Harringay; died in St Pancras, London.

References

1920 births
1959 deaths
English cricketers
Middlesex cricketers
Marylebone Cricket Club cricketers